Love Me! is a 1986 Swedish drama film directed by Kay Pollak. It was entered into the 36th Berlin International Film Festival.

Cast
 Anna Lindén as Sussie
 Örjan Ramberg as 'Oxen'
 Tomas Fryk as Tomas
 Hans Strååt as Larsson
 Tomas Laustiola as Gunnar
 Ernst Günther Jr. as Social services inspector
 Lena Granhagen as Martha
 Jenny Kai-Larsen as Ann
 Gun Ahnlund
 Carl-Olof Alm
 Elisabet Palo as The mother
 Stig Torstensson as 'Kattmannen'

References

External links

1986 films
1980s Swedish-language films
1986 drama films
Films directed by Kay Pollak
Films about weddings
Swedish drama films
1980s Swedish films